Balvantray Mehta is an Indian politician. He was elected to the Lok Sabha, the lower house of the Parliament of India from Gohilwad in Gujarat as a member of the Indian National Congress.

References

External links
Official biographical sketch in Parliament of India website

India MPs 1952–1957
India MPs 1957–1962
Lok Sabha members from Gujarat
1899 births
Indian National Congress politicians from Gujarat
Year of death missing